The Asian Universities Alliance (AUA) is a university alliance comprising 15 member institutions across Asia. Initiated at Tsinghua University in March 2016 and founded on 29 April 2017, through its platform AUA aims to cooperatively address regional and global challenges relating to higher education as well as economic, scientific and technological development. The Presidency is currently held by Tsinghua University and the current Executive Presidency for 2021-2022 is Universiti Malaya. The Secretariat is permanently hosted by Tsinghua University.

Members

Mission 
The mission of AUA is to "jointly address regional and global challenges, specifically related to higher education and economic, scientific and technological development, by strengthening collaboration among member institutions."

Governance
The Board is the governing body of the AUA and consists of the heads of member institutions. There are currently 15 Board Members i.e. the heads of the 15 AUA member institutions.

AUA Student Mobility Programs

AUA Youth Forum 
The AUA Youth Forum (AUAYF) is a flagship program organized and hosted annually by the Executive Presidency. In line with the mission of AUA, the AUAYF is dedicated to addressing developmental issues in the Asian region, enhancing youth empowerment, and promoting cultural and academic exchanges among the AUA students. It aims to promote a vision of sustainability, innovativeness and collaboration through joint activities in a way that encourages the collective sharing of knowledge and the founding of multinational friendships. Each AUAYF focuses on a specific topic and theme drawn from the AUA Framework.

Asia Deep Dive Programs 
The Asia Deep Dive Program (ADDP) provides opportunities for students to have an immersive cultural experience in the country of the host university. The 2-week program aims to deepen students’ understanding of Asia's various cultures and societies in order to improve communication and foster deeper cross cultural exchange and cooperation. This program also strives to broaden the minds of students and nurtures them to become empowered, global minded citizens.

Overseas Study Programs 
Overseas Study Programs bring together students of similar academic interests to attend intensive short term courses hosted by member institutions. Each program centers around an AUA theme aiming to broaden students' knowledge of the selected disciplines and help them gain valuable insights and increased cultural savviness through the exchange of academic ideas with peers and professors of different countries.

Arts and Sports Events 
Many AUA member universities have vibrant arts and sports communities. Artistic and sports education constitute an important part of university education as well as campus life. Arts and Sports Events allow students to showcase their talents and share cross cultural experiences with one another. Through artistic endeavors and sportsmanship, these programs help students grow into creative and independent thinkers.

AUA Scholars Award Program
In March 2018, the AUA Scholars Award Program (AUASAP) was launched with the purpose of increasing the mobility of scholars among the AUA member universities. The Award is open to all faculty members and researchers of AUA universities. AUA provides financial support to up to 60 Scholars each year who wish to conduct short-term academic visits at another overseas AUA university. Scholars are encouraged to take this opportunity to advance research, share knowledge, conduct field study or establish international academic links in the community of AUA.

AUA Staff Exchange Program
In order to enhance communications between staff of the AUA members, AUA established the AUA Staff Exchange Program (AUASEP) in April 2018. The program provides financial support to up to 15 staff per year from an AUA member university or the Secretariat to carry out a one-week visit to another overseas AUA member or the Secretariat.

Research Collaboration 
Each year, AUA supports its member institutions to hold academic conferences on topics drawn from the AUA themes. The conferences aim to bring together peer scholars from AUA member institutions to meet, share and discuss their research of a particular academic domain. AUA also supports member institutions to develop joint research initiatives as well as a document delivery service among libraries of member institutions.

Strategy and Policy 
AUA is dedicated to providing a platform that generates quality discussions on university strategies, policies, and practices. Through the AUA Presidents Forum (AUAPF), which is held annually during the AUA Summit, university leaders congregate for high-level dialogues on the development of strategic plans, the improvement of management systems, and to address problems related to higher education. AUA also encourages developing dialogues and platforms for exchange among senior managers and staff of specific departments with the purpose of sharing best practices.

Asian Higher Education Outlook (AHEO)
The Asian Higher Education Outlook (AHEO) report is published annually by AUA. AHEO aims to provide deeper insights into the higher education systems of AUA members as well as the wider Asian region in order to better understand the shared strengths and challenges faced by members and the Asian higher education sector in general. All the 15 founding members of AUA have contributed to the reports by writing chapters, providing key data, or offering suggestions for revision. The reports provide a voice to Asian universities, increase their presence and establish the influence of AUA within and beyond Asia. The first report AHEO 2018: “Creation and Direction of the Asian Universities Alliance” was published by Tsinghua University Press in November 2018. The second report AHEO 2019: “Education Innovation” was published by Routledge Press in 2019.

References

External links

International college and university associations and consortia
College and university associations and consortia in Asia